Bucklebury Farm Park is an animal park located in Bucklebury in Berkshire, England. The Farm Park consists of mostly Animals, Play equipment, Deer and Woody's Cafe which opened in 2013. Bucklebury Farm Park also houses a revolutionary Jumping Pillow which is one of only few in the UK.

External links

Parks and open spaces in Berkshire
Tourist attractions in Berkshire
Bucklebury